Boccaccio is a crater on Mercury. It has a diameter of 151.95 kilometers. Its name was adopted by the International Astronomical Union (IAU) in 1976. Boccaccio is named for the Italian author Giovanni Boccaccio, who lived from 1313 to 1375.

References

Impact craters on Mercury
Giovanni Boccaccio